Elections to Strathclyde Regional Council were held on Thursday 8 May 1986, on the same day as the eight other Scottish regional elections. This was the fourth election to the regional council following the local government reforms in the 1970s.

The election used the 103 electoral divisions created by the Initial Reviews of Electoral Arrangements in 1978. Each electoral division elected one councillor using first-past-the-post voting.

Labour, who had won every previous election to Strathclyde Regional Council, retained a large majority by winning 87 of the 103 seats – up eight from the previous election in 1982. The Conservatives remained as the second largest party despite losing more than half of their seats. The party won six seats – down from 15 in 1982 – as their vote share fell by almost 10%. The Liberal Party increased their representation on the regional council by one after winning five seats. This would be the last Strathclyde Regional Council election contested by the Liberal Party which merged with Social Democratic Party (SDP) to form the Liberal Democrats in 1988. Despite coming second in the popular vote and increasing their vote share to 17.5%, the Scottish National Party (SNP) retained only two of their three seats. The remaining three seats were won by independent candidates.

The Liberal Party and the SDP contested this election as a political alliance in which only one of the two parties would stand a candidate in any given seat.

Results

Source:

Electoral division results

Kilmarnock North

Kilmarnock South

Stewarton and Irvine Valley

Cumnock

New Cumnock and Doon Valley

References

1986 Scottish local elections
1986